Captain Mohan Singh Kohli (b. 11 December 1931 at Haripur) is an internationally renowned Indian mountaineer. An officer in the Indian Navy who joined the Indo-Tibetan Border Police, he led the 1965 Indian expedition which put nine men on the summit of Everest, a world record which lasted for 17 years.

Affiliation 
Mohan Singh Kohli was President of the Indian Mountaineering Foundation from 1989 to 1993. In 1989, he co-founded the Himalayan Environment Trust. Trekking in The Himalayas was founded by Captain M.S. Kohli who has been climbing many Himalayan Peaks. It was his feeling that not many people in the world can climb Himalayan peaks but many can go to the basecamps of the mountains.

Awards 
He has been honoured with the
 Padma Bhushan
 Arjuna Award
 Ati Vishisht Seva Medal
 IMF Gold Medal
 Punjab Govt's Nishan-e-Khalsa
 Delhi Govt's Most Distinguished Citizen of Delhi Award
 Tenzing Norgay National Adventure Award 2007 in lifetime achievement category
and several international recognitions.

1965 Everest expedition 

Captain M.S. Kohli is best known as India's first successful leader of the epoch-making Indian Everest Expedition 1965. The achievement electrified the nation. Nine climbers reached the summit, creating a world record that India held for 17 years. Public euphoria reached a crescendo. People danced in the streets. On return of the team from Nepal to India, breaking all protocol, the Prime Minister headed the reception at the airport. In another unprecedented move, an Arjuna Award for the entire team and Padma Bhushan/Padma Shri for all eleven team members was immediately announced.

His tallest tribute came from none other than the former Prime Minister, Indira Gandhi: “The record of Commander Kohli’s expedition will find special mention in history. It was a masterpiece of planning, organization, teamwork, individual effort and leadership”. Gandhi also described the 1965 success as one of India's six major achievements after Independence.

A full-length film on the expedition with music by Shankar Jaikishan was released all over India and abroad. The story of the spectacular achievement was serialised in several national newspapers and magazines. Kohli, with some members, was felicitated at Brussels, Paris, Geneva and Rome. Tenzing Norgay accompanied Captain Kohli to several countries.

The record of landing atop many mountain summits also is held by Captain M.S. Kohli who along with Tenzing Norgay landed atop a dozen mountain tops in Europe piloted by Raymond Lambert in his small Pilatus Porter plane.
 
In India, Chief Ministers of almost all the States invited the team to their capitals and honoured it at State and Civic receptions. On 8 September 1965, Kohli was invited to address Members of both the Houses of the Indian Parliament in the Central Hall.

Adventure clubs and Himalayan expeditions multiplied several-fold, triggering a national resurgence in Indian mountaineering.

Early life 
Born and brought up at Haripur on the banks of Indus in the Karakoram mountains of North West Frontier, Kohli witnessed the massacre of over 2,000 innocent persons during the carnage of the partition of India.

Starting with Saser Kangri (25,170 ft) in 1956, he has been on 20 major Himalayan expeditions which included India's first ascent of Nanda Kot and maiden ascent of Annapurna III. He belongs to the exclusive band of three climbers in the world who, in 1962, spent three consecutive nights, two without oxygen, on Everest in raging blizzards at 27,650 feet.

During his years with the Indian Navy, he introduced adventure as part of training. During 15 years with the Indo-Tibetan Border Police, from its inception, he turned the force into a formidable mountaineering organisation. Under the charge of India's legendary police officers, B.N. Mullick and R.N. Kao, he led seven dangerous, challenging and highly sensitive missions of great national importance along with climbers and scientists from the USA. The task involved installing nuclear powered spy listening devices on top of some of the Indian Himalayan peaks to spy on the Chinese missile capabilities.  This largest, longest and costliest expedition will form the plot of a Hollywood movie.

On joining Air-India in 1971, Kohli conceived and personally promoted ‘Trekking in the Himalayas’ all over the world by visiting over 50 countries and making over 1000 presentations which included world's most popular TV programmes, ‘To Tell the Truth’ and ‘David Frost Show’. On 3 December 1978, he flew over the South Pole.

To save the Himalayas from the brink of disaster, he secured the support of Sir Edmund Hillary and other Himalayan legends – Maurice Herzog, Sir Chris Bonington, Reinhold Messner and Junko Tabei – to establish the Himalayan Environment Trust on 14 October 1989. During the past two decades the HET helped saving the world heritage for future generations.

In India, he also introduced Himalayan tourism, white-water rafting, aero-sports, luxury sea cruises, tourist charters to Goa, international conferences, Himalayan mountaineering and tourism meets and opened Lakshadweep and the Andaman Islands to tourism.

His 14-year tenure in the Indian Mountaineering Foundation as Vice-President/President saw many landmark developments. Since his retirement in 1990, declining several lucrative offers, he has been passionately working on all-round development of youth through various adventure and outdoor leadership projects.

Books and Magazines 
 Incredible Himalayas, Indus Publishing (2005) 
 Mountains of India, Indus Publishing (2004) 
 The Great Himalayan Climb, Orient Paperbacks (2003) 
 Spies in the Snow, How CIA and the Indian Intelligence Lost a Nuclear Device in the Himalayas
 Spies of Anil in the Himalayas: Secret Missions and Perilous Climbs, University Press of Kansas (2003) 
  The Himalayas: Playground of the Gods: Trekking, Climbing, Adventure (2000)  M.S. Kohli
 Mountaineering in India (1989)

See also
Indian summiters of Mount Everest - Year wise
List of Mount Everest summiters by number of times to the summit
List of Mount Everest records of India
List of Mount Everest records

References 

http://captainmskohli.com/about-me.html

External links 

 Bio details on publisher's website
 History of mountaineering in the Indo-Tibetan Border Police
 The missing radioactive sensor, Deccan Herald, April 25, 2004
 CIA nuclear device atop Himalayas, Times of India, June 5, 2003
 

Indian mountain climbers
1931 births
Living people
Recipients of the Padma Bhushan in sports
Recipients of the Arjuna Award
Kirori Mal College alumni
Recipients of the Tenzing Norgay National Adventure Award
Recipients of Indian Mountaineering Foundation's Gold Medal